WFMB (1450 kHz) is a commercial AM radio station broadcasting a sports radio format.  Licensed to Springfield, Illinois, the station is owned by Neuhoff Corp., through licensee Neuhoff Media Springfield, LLC.  WFMB features local hosts in morning and afternoon drive time, plus agricultural reports weekdays at 5:30 a.m. and noon.  The rest of the schedule comes from ESPN Radio.

WFMB is powered at 1,000 watts non-directional.  In addition, programming is also heard on FM translator W222CG at 92.3 MHz.

History

WCBS
The call letters were unrelated to what would later become the CBS Radio Network or WCBS in New York City.  

WCBS started as a portable broadcasting station assigned to Harold L. Dewing and Charles H. Messter of Providence, Rhode Island. Portable stations could be transported from place-to-place on movable platforms such as trucks. They were commonly hired out for a few weeks at a time to theaters located in small towns that didn't have their own radio stations, to be used for special programs broadcast to the local community. (Regulating "moving targets" proved difficult, so in May 1928 the Federal Radio Commission announced it was ending the licensing of portable facilities.) This was the second portable station licensed to Messter, joining WCBR, first licensed in 1924.

WCBS time as a portable station was brief. After finding limited prospects in New England, Harold Dewing set out for the Midwest. He moved the station to Springfield in late 1926, where it gave a debut broadcast from the Lyric Theater on December 10, and Springfield became the station's permanent home.

In 1927, WCBS's frequency was changed from 1230 kHz to 1430 kHz, and in 1927 its frequency was changed to 1210 kHz. It ran 100 watts, and shared time on the frequency with WTAX. The station's frequency was changed to 1420 kHz in 1935. Its daytime power was increased to 250 watts in 1937 and its nighttime power was increased to 250 watts in 1939. Its frequency was changed to 1450 kHz in March 1941, as a result of the North American Regional Broadcasting Agreement.

WCVS
On September 8, 1946, the station call sign was changed to WCVS so that the CBS Radio flagship station in New York City could become WCBS. In 1958, WCVS was sold to Jerome William O'Connor's WPFA Radio Inc. for $285,000. Its daytime power was increased to 1,000 watts in 1962. In 1966, the station was sold to Eastern Broadcasting Corporation for $700,000.

WCVS aired a Top 40 format in the 1960s and 1970s. In the mid 1980s, as contemporary hit music was moving the FM band, the station switched a full service, adult contemporary format. In 1989, the station was sold to Neuhoff Broadcasting, along with 104.5 WFMB, for $4,250,000. By 1989, the station had adopted an oldies format.

WFMB
On October 1, 1992, the station's call sign was changed to WFMB, and it adopted a country music format, with programming from the Real Country network. In 1994, the station adopted a sports talk format.

In 1996, the station was sold to Patterson Broadcasting, which, after a series of acquisitions, would become part of Clear Channel Communications. In 2007, as Clear Channel was selling most of its stations in smaller markets, Neuhoff bought back the Springfield stations they had sold, including WFMB-FM.

The station still operates from an historic radio tower in suburban Springfield, IL (Southern View), which was constructed in the late 1940s, and was the original transmitter location for WICS TV 20.

Translator
WFMB is also heard on 92.3 MHz, through a translator in Springfield, Illinois.  The translator formerly broadcast at 107.1, with a strongly directional signal to the northeast, from about 2014 until February 2019.  On February 22, 2019, the translator moved to a non-directional signal at 92.3.

References

External links
WFMB's website

FCC History Cards for WFMB (covering WCBS / WCVS for 1927-1981)

FMB
Sports radio stations in the United States
Radio stations established in 1926